Trevor Alexander Gaylor (born November 3, 1977 in St. Louis, Missouri) is a retired wide receiver in the NFL. He was drafted in the fourth round of the 2000 NFL Draft by the San Diego Chargers. He would also play for the Atlanta Falcons and Detroit Lions of the NFL and Edmonton Eskimos of the CFL.

Trevor spent his high school career at Hazelwood West High School in Hazelwood, MO. He played college football at Miami University, where he caught 128 passes for 2,131 yards and 20 touchdowns over four seasons.  As a senior, he had 52 receptions for 1,028 yards and 11 scores, while also completing an 81-yard pass.

References 

1977 births
Living people
American football wide receivers
Atlanta Falcons players
Canadian football wide receivers
Edmonton Elks players
Miami RedHawks football players
San Diego Chargers players